Chopper One is a short-lived ABC action-crime television series in early 1974, depicting the activities of a fictional California police helicopter team. The program was produced by television powerhouse Spelling-Goldberg Productions. The series aired in a half-hour time slot on Thursdays at 8 p.m. Eastern.

The show aired adjacent to Firehouse, an action-drama series about a Los Angeles fire station. Chopper One was cancelled after six months with Firehouse promptly ending the following month.

Story and Characters

Chopper One was directed by E.W. Swackhamer, featuring two flight police officers (a pilot and an observer) and their adventures in a police helicopter. The helicopter was a Bell 206 JetRanger. 
It starred Jim McMullan as Officer Don Burdick and Dirk Benedict as Officer Gil Foley. Benedict would later earn fame as Lt. Starbuck in the original 1978 TV show Battlestar Galactica and as Lt. Templeton 'Faceman' Peck in the TV show The A-Team.

Ted Hartley played their boss Capt. McKeegan and Lou Frizzell played Mitch, the crusty mechanic.

Episodes

Home Media and Streaming Services
Since its cancellation in 1974, Chopper One was reported to have rarely (if ever) been seen again in rerun syndication.

On July 12, 2016, Sony Pictures released Chopper One: The Complete Series on DVD in Region 1. This is a Manufacture-on-Demand (MOD) release, available exclusively in the US and is part of the Sony Pictures Choice Collection in partnership with Amazon.com and their CreateSpace MOD program.

As of 2023, all 13 episodes of Chopper One are available on free video streaming service Crackle.

References

External links
Chopper One on ABC at TV Guide
 

1974 American television series debuts
1974 American television series endings
American Broadcasting Company original programming
1970s American crime drama television series
American adventure television series
Television series by Spelling Television
Television series by Sony Pictures Television
Television shows set in Los Angeles
Aviation television series